Ranbaxy Laboratories Limited was an Indian multinational pharmaceutical company that was incorporated in India in 1961 and remained an entity until 2014. The company went public in 1973. Ownership of Ranbaxy changed twice over the course of its history.

In 2008, Japanese pharmaceutical company Daiichi Sankyo acquired a controlling share in Ranbaxy and in 2014, Sun Pharma acquired 100% of Ranbaxy in an all-stock deal. The Sun Pharma acquisition brought all new management to Ranbaxy, which had been laden with controversy (see Controversies below). Sun is the world's fifth largest specialty generic pharmaceutical company.

History

Formation
Ranbaxy was started by Ranbir Singh and Gurbax Singh in 1937 as a distributor for Japanese company Shionogi. The name Ranbaxy blends the names of its founders: Ranbir and Gurbax. Bhai Mohan Singh bought the company in 1952 from his cousins Ranbir and Gurbax. After Bhai Mohan Singh's son Parvinder Singh joined the company in 1967, the company saw an increase in scale.

In the late 1990s, Ranbaxy formed a US company, Ranbaxy Pharmaceuticals Inc., in order to support its entry into the pharmaceutical market in United States.

Trading
For the twelve months ending on 31 December 2005, the company's global sales were US$1,178 million, with overseas markets accounting for 75% of global sales (USA: 28%, Europe: 17%, Brazil, Russia, and China: 29%).

In December 2005, Ranbaxy's share price was hit by a patent ruling disallowing production of its own version of Pfizer's cholesterol-cutting drug Lipitor, which had annual sales of more than $10 billion. 

In June 2008, Ranbaxy settled the patent dispute with Pfizer, allowing them to sell atorvastatin calcium, the generic version of Lipitor and atorvastatin calcium-amlodipine besylate, the generic version of Pfizer's Caduet, in the US, starting on 30 November 2011.

On 23 June 2006, the US Food & Drug Administration granted Ranbaxy a 180-day exclusivity period to sell simvastatin (Zocor) in the US as a generic drug at 80 mg strength. Ranbaxy competed with the maker of brand-name Zocor, Merck & Co.; IVAX Corporation (which was acquired by and merged into Teva Pharmaceutical Industries Ltd.), which has 180-day exclusivity at strengths other than 80  mg; and Dr. Reddy's Laboratories and India, whose authorized generic version (licensed by Merck) is exempt from exclusivity.

On 1 December 2011, Ranbaxy got approval from the FDA to launch the generic version of Lipitor in the United States after the drug's patent expired.

Acquisition by Daiichi Sankyo 

In June 2008, Daiichi Sankyo acquired a 34.8% stake in Ranbaxy from the family of CEO and Managing Director Malvinder Mohan Singh for  10,000 crore (US$2.4 billion) at 737 per share.

In November 2008, Daiichi-Sankyo completed the takeover of the company from the founding Singh family in a deal worth $4.6 billion by acquiring a 63.92% stake in Ranbaxy. Ranbaxy's Malvinder Singh remained as CEO after the transaction.
The addition of Ranbaxy Laboratories extended Daiichi-Sankyo's operations, with the combined company worth about US$30 billion.

In 2009, it was reported that former Novartis Senior Vice-President Yugal Sikri would lead the Indian operations of Ranbaxy Laboratories.

In 2011, Ranbaxy Global Consumer Health Care received the OTC Company of the year award. 

In 2012, 2013, and 2014 Brand Trust Reports, Ranbaxy was ranked 161st, 225th, and 184th respectively among India's most trusted brands.

Acquisition by Sun Pharmaceutical 

On 7 April 2014, India-based Sun Pharmaceutical and Japan-based Daiichi Sankyo jointly announced the sale of the entire 63.4% share of Ranbaxy from Daiichi Sankyo to Sun Pharmaceutical in a $4 billion all-share deal. Under these agreements, shareholders of Ranbaxy were to receive a 0.8 share of Sun Pharmaceutical for each share of Ranbaxy. After this acquisition, the partner Daiichi-Sankyo was to hold a stake of 9% in Sun Pharmaceutical.

Controversies 
During 2004–2005, Dinesh Thakur and Rajinder Kumar, two Indian employees of Ranbaxy, blew the whistle on Ranbaxy's fabrication of drug test reports. Thakur's office computer was soon found to have been compromised. Ranbaxy then accused Thakur of visiting pornographic sites using his office computer, forcing him to resign in 2005. Thakur left India for the United States and contacted the Food and Drug Administration (FDA), which started investigating his claims. As a result, on 16 September 2008, the Food and Drug Administration issued two warning letters to Ranbaxy Laboratories Ltd. and an Import Alert for generic drugs produced by two manufacturing plants in India.

By 25 February 2009, the FDA said it had halted reviews of all drug applications, including data developed at Ranbaxy's Paonta Sahib plant in India, because of a practice of falsified data and test results in approved and pending drug applications.

On 8 February 2012, three batches of the proton-pump inhibitor Pantoprazole were recalled in the Netherlands due to the presence of impurities.

On 9 November 2012, Ranbaxy halted production and recalled 41 lots of atorvastatin due to glass particles being found in some bottles. Also in 2012, an apparent dosage mistake was reported in which 20 mg tablets were found in a bottle of atorvastatin labeled as containing 10 mg tablets; this led in 2014 to the voluntary recall in the United States of some 64,000 bottles.

In May 2013, Ranbaxy pleaded guilty and paid $500 million in fines, for felony charges relating to the manufacture and distribution of certain adulterated drugs made at two of Ranbaxy's manufacturing facilities in India, and misrepresenting clinical generic drug data. Ranbaxy pleaded guilty to three felony FDCA counts, and four felony counts of knowingly making materially false statements to the FDA.  Included in the adulterated products were antiretroviral (ARV) drugs destined for treatment of HIV/AIDS in Africa.

In September 2013, further problems were reported, including apparent human hair in a tablet, oil spots on other tablets, toilet facilities without running water, and a failure to instruct employees to wash their hands after using the toilet. Ranbaxy was prohibited from manufacturing FDA-regulated drugs at the Mohali facility until it complied with United States drug manufacturing requirements.

In 2014, The FDA notified Ranbaxy Laboratories, Ltd., that it was prohibited from manufacturing and distributing active pharmaceutical ingredients (APIs) from its facility in Toansa, India, for FDA-regulated drug products. The FDA's inspection of the Toansa facility, which concluded on 11 January 2014, identified significant CGMP violations. These included Toansa staff retesting raw materials, intermediate drug products, and finished API after those items failed analytical testing and specifications, in order to produce acceptable findings, and subsequently not reporting or investigating these failures.

In 2019 author Katherine Eban published Bottle of Lies, an in-depth investigation of Ranbaxy.  In addition to the incidents described above, Eban describes internal struggles within the FDA as investigators who might have shut down Ranbaxy were overruled due to pressure to increase the supply of cheap generic drugs.

See also 
The Truth Pill

References

External links

Ranbaxy: Official site (archived)

Pharmaceutical companies of India
Companies based in Gurgaon
Companies listed on the Bombay Stock Exchange
Pharmaceutical companies established in 1961
Generic drug manufacturers
Indian brands
1961 establishments in East Punjab
Indian companies established in 1961